Polyptychoides is a genus of moths in the family Sphingidae erected by Robert Herbert Carcasson in 1968.

Species
Polyptychoides afarissaque Darge, 2004
Polyptychoides assimilis Rothschild & Jordan 1903
Polyptychoides cadioui Darge, 2005
Polyptychoides digitatus (Karsch 1891)
Polyptychoides erosus (Jordan 1923)
Polyptychoides grayii (Walker 1856)
Polyptychoides insulanus Darge, 2004
Polyptychoides mbarikensis Darge & Minetti, 2005
Polyptychoides niloticus (Jordan 1921)
Polyptychoides obtusus Darge, 2004
Polyptychoides politzari Darge & Basquin, 2005
Polyptychoides ruaha Darge, 2004
Polyptychoides septentrionalis Darge, 2004
Polyptychoides vuattouxi Pierre 1989

References

 
Smerinthini
Taxa named by Robert Herbert Carcasson
Moth genera